Elemental Part Three: Rose is an EP by Demdike Stare, released in January 2012  by Modern Love Records.

Track listing

Personnel
Adapted from the Elemental Part Three: Rose liner notes.

Demdike Stare
 Sean Canty – producer
 Miles Whittaker – producerProduction and additional personnel
 Radu Prepeleac – design
 Andy Votel – cover art

Release history

References 

2012 EPs
Demdike Stare albums
Modern Love Records albums
Instrumental EPs